James L. Collins (1883-1953) was a self-made oil man later turned banker and community philanthropist. 

A native of Weston, West Virginia, Collins early proved  opportunistic and self-reliant.  As a teenager, he abandoned formal school work to chase after roustabout work in wildcat oil fields in Oklahoma, Louisiana, and California.  

In the early 1920s, at the time of the discovery of Powell oil field in eastern Navarro County, Texas, and the nearby Mexia field in Limestone County, he formed a rewarding partnership with R.L. Wheelock in Corsicana, Texas.

Collins soon became well known in the petroleum industry and active in community and church roles.  He eventually won election as an officer of the Mid-Continental Oil and Gas industry Association and of the Independent Petroleum Association of America, and served as director of Corsicana's First National Bank.

At his death in Corsicana, Texas in 1953, Collins' sizable estate was apportioned among four major beneficiaries: a namesake parochial school,  The Texas Scottish Rite Hospital for Crippled Children, St. Joseph's Orphanage of Dallas, and a scholarship fund to help graduates of Corsicana High School attend college.

The James L. Collins Elementary School today has about 175 students in grades K-8.  After thousands of awards and now nearing 60 years since their initial establishment, the local college scholarships continue to be awarded yearly to a few dozen students.

References

American businesspeople in the oil industry
1953 deaths
1883 births